American Ballet Theatre (ABT) is a classical ballet company based in New York City. Founded in 1939 by Lucia Chase and Richard Pleasant, it is recognized as one of the world's leading classical ballet companies. Through 2019, it had an annual eight-week season at the Metropolitan Opera House (Lincoln Center) in the spring and a shorter season at the David H. Koch Theater in the fall; the company tours around the world the rest of the year. The company was scheduled to have a 5-week spring season at the MET preceded by a 2-week season at the Koch Theater beginning in 2020.   ABT is the parent company of the American Ballet Theatre Jacqueline Kennedy Onassis School, and was recognized as "America's National Ballet Company" in 2006 by the United States Congress.

History 
In 1939 Pleasant and Chase committed to the creation of "a large scale company with an eclectic repertory". The pair and a small group from Mordkin Ballet formed Ballet Theatre. Their new company's first performance was on 11 January 1940. Chase began developing the company's repertoire of well-known full-length ballets, as well as original works, amidst financial issues. In 1945 Oliver Smith joined Ballet Theatre and became co-director with Chase.

In 1957 the company changed its name to American Ballet Theatre. It continued to emphasize ballet classics, yet remained challenged by financial issues. During the 1960s and 1970s, the company's prospects brightened due to more favorable private funding. During this period, American Ballet Theatre shifted its ballet focus to the recruitment of star performers. In 1977, the company began its spring season at the Metropolitan Opera House, its new official venue.

Mikhail Baryshnikov in 1980 became Artistic Director for American Ballet Theatre. Baryshnikov staged, restaged, and refurbished numerous classical ballets and, according to the company, strengthened their classical tradition. Baryshnikov was replaced in 1989 by Jane Hermann and Oliver Smith, who remained as Artistic Directors until 1992, when Kevin McKenzie received the appointment. McKenzie satisfied the demands of the traditional ballet audience by prioritizing full-length narrative ballets. He also succeeded in keeping the company afloat during financially unstable times. In 2004 he established an official associate ballet school, the Jacqueline Kennedy Onassis School. After a long period of no in-house choreographer, McKenzie appointed Alexei Ratmansky as "Artist in Residence" in January 2009.

McKenzie stepped down from the company in late 2022, as announced in 2021. Susan Jaffe was appointed was announced as McKenzie's successor, and took over the company at the end of 2022. Ratmansky is set to depart the troupe in June 2023.

Artistic staff

Artistic directors 
 Lucia Chase and Oliver Smith (1940–1980)
 Mikhail Baryshnikov (1980–1989)
 Jane Hermann and Oliver Smith (1989–1992)
 Kevin McKenzie (1992–2022)
 Susan Jaffe (2022–present)

Executive director and CEO
 Rachel S. Moore Executive director (2003-2011) CEO (2011-2016)

Executive director
 Kara Medoff Barnett (2016–2021)
Janet Rollé (2021–present)

Resident choreographers 
 Antony Tudor (1940–1950)
 Alexei Ratmansky (2009–2023)

Music directors, conductors, concertmasters (partial list)
 Ormsby Wilkins (music director) (current)
 Charles Barker (principal conductor) (current)
 David LaMarche (conductor) (current)
 Benjamin Bowman (concertmaster) (current)

Dancers  

American Ballet Theatre has four levels within the company. They are (in ascending order): apprentice, corps de ballet, soloist, and principal.

Principals

Soloists

Former dancers 
The following is a partial list of former dancers with ABT, listed by their highest rank prior to leaving the company.

Former principal dancers 

 Stella Abrera (1996-2020)
 Ivan Allen (1950s–1960s)
 Alicia Alonso (1943–1948)
 Nina Ananiashvili (1993–2009)
 Victor Barbee (1975–2003)
 Mikhail Baryshnikov (1974–1978)
 Patrick Bissell (1977–1987)
 Julio Bocca (1986–2006)
 Karena Brock (1973–?)
 Leslie Browne (1976–1993)
 Erik Bruhn (1949–1958, 1961–1972)
 Fernando Bujones (1972–85, 1990s)
 José Manuel Carreño (1995–2011)
 Lucia Chase (1940–1960)
 Ángel Corella (1996–2012)
 Eleonor D'Antuono (1961–1981)
 Anton Dolin (1940–1946)
 Irina Dvorovenko (1996–2013)
 Alessandra Ferri (1985–2007)
 Carla Fracci (1967–?)
 Alexander Godunov (1979–1982)
 Guillaume Graffin (1988–2005)
 Cynthia Gregory (1965–1991)
 Cynthia Harvey (1974–1986, 1988–1996)
 Susan Jaffe (1980–2002)
 Julie Kent (1993–2015)
 Gelsey Kirkland (1974–1984)

 Ruth Ann Koesun (1946-1969)
 John Kriza (1940–1966)
 Robert La Fosse (1977–1986)
 Harold Lang (1943–1945)
 Annabelle Lyon (1939–1943)
 Natalia Makarova (1970–1986)
 Vladimir Malakhov (1995–2008)
 Alicia Markova (1941–1946)
 Bruce Marks (1961–1968)
 Kevin McKenzie (1979–1991)
 Amanda McKerrow (1982–2005)
 Kathleen Moore (1982–2006) 
 Veronika Part (2002–2017)
 Kirk Peterson (1974–1980)
 Danilo Radojevic (1978–1993)
 Johan Renvall (1978–1996)
 Keith Roberts (1987–1999)
 Ethan Stiefel (1997–2012)
 Marianna Tcherkassky (1970–1996)
 Ashley Tuttle (1987–2004)
 Martine van Hamel (1970–1992)
 Edward Verso (1962–1968)
 Michele Wiles (1998–2011)
 Diana Vishneva (2005–2017)
 Marcelo Gomes (1997–2018)
 Roberto Bolle (2009-2019)
 Sarah Lane (2004-2020)

Former soloists  

 Kristi Boone (2000–2014)
 Ethan Brown (1981–2004)
 Gabrielle Brown (1980–1996)
 Sandra Brown (1987–2003)
 Tener Brown (1979–1986)
 Carmen Corella (1998–2007)
 Lykke Håkansson (2007–2010)
 Erica Cornejo (1998–2007)
 George de la Peña (1970s–1985)
 Joaquín De Luz (1997–2003)
 Lisa de Ribere (1979–1984)
 Melissa Hayden (1945–1947)
 Yuriko Kajiya (2002–2014)
 Elaine Kudo
 Anna Liceica (1996–2007)
 Carlos Lopez (2001–2011)
 Charles Maple (1972–1983)
 Jared Matthews (2002–2014)
 Simone Messmer (2002–2013)
 Monique Meunier (2002–2007)
 Carlos Molina (1998–2007)
 Sascha Radetsky (1995–2014)
 Amy Rose (1979–1992)
 Gennadi Saveliev (1996–2012)

Former corps de ballet 

 Susan Borree
 Maria Bystrova (2000–2010)
 Caroline Duprot (2009–2011)
 Tobin Eason (2002–2012)
 Aino Ettala (2010)
 Hezekiah C. Fairbank (1999–2000)
 Victoria (Born) Fornelli (1999–2000)
 Jeffrey Golladay (2003–2012)
 Meaghan Hinkis (2010–2011)
 Carrie Jensen (2000–2009)
 Clinton Luckett (1992–2002)
 Ellizzette Duvall (1970–1973)
 Ilona McHugh (1997–2005)
 Patrick Ogle
 Joseph Phillips (2008–2013)
Brendali Staana Espiritu
 Isaac Stappas (2000–2011)
 Sarawanee Tanatanit (2002–2008)
 Mary Mills Thomas (2008–2011)
 Melissa Thomas (2002–2009)
 Simon Wexler 
 Jennifer Whalen
 Katharine Wildish (1985–1987)

 Renata Pavam (2002-)
 Bo Busby

Repertoire 

Perhaps no other choreographer was as closely associated with ABT as the great British choreographer Antony Tudor, who made his American debut with the company. The other continuous creative force was the legendary Agnes de Mille. She staged the majority of her ballet works with them. Many choreographers have mounted works especially for ABT, including George Balanchine, Adolph Bolm, Michel Fokine, Léonide Massine, and Bronislava Nijinska. Other renowned choreographers who have worked at ABT include Jerome Robbins, Twyla Tharp, and Alvin Ailey.

ABT's 1976 production of The Nutcracker starring Mikhail Baryshnikov and Gelsey Kirkland was televised the following year and has become a broadcast classic.

The main season is held during the spring at New York City's Metropolitan Opera House, with shorter seasons in the fall previously held at New York City Center, now held at the David H. Koch Theater. Performances of Alexei Ratmansky's The Nutcracker during the holiday season are held at the Segerstrom Center for the Arts. The company tours extensively throughout United States and the world.

The current choreographer-in-residence for ABT is Alexei Ratmansky.

Schools and programs

Jacqueline Kennedy Onassis School 
The Jacqueline Kennedy Onassis School at American Ballet Theatre (ABT/JKO School) is the associate school of American Ballet Theatre located within the Flatiron District of Manhattan, New York City. The school comprises a Children's Division for ages 4 to 12, a Pre-Professional Division for ages 12 to 18, and the preparatory program Studio Company for ages 16 to 20. Cynthia Harvey, a former dancer with ABT, serves as the school's artistic director.

Studio Company 
ABT Studio Company, formerly known as ABT II, is a small company of 12 young dancers, ranging from ages 16 to 20, handpicked by ABT. It is the top level of the American Ballet Theatre training ladder and is currently an extension of the ABT JKO school. These dancers are trained in the program to join ABT's main company or other leading professional companies, and the program is described by ABT as "a bridge between ballet training and professional performance".

Project Plié 
Project Plié is a diversity initiative launched in 2013 by Rachel Moore, who was then ABT's executive director and CEO.  Following her departure, the project was overseen by artistic director Kevin McKenzie and Mary Jo Ziesel, ABT director of education and training. The program was inspired by ABT principal dancer Misty Copeland, and aims to "increase racial and ethnic representation in ballet and diversify America's ballet companies". The initiative is made up of a combination of partnerships within the community and within the industry in addition to scholarships and opportunities for exposure for children of color. Annually, as of 2013, Project Plié has awarded scholarships to young people ranging from ages 9 to 18 including to the ABT/JKO School, ABT's summer intensive programs and ABT's Young Dancer Workshop.

See also 
A Dancer's Life, a 1972 documentary film about the company
List of productions of Swan Lake derived from its 1895 revival

References 
Notes

Further viewing

External links 

 
 American Ballet Theatre entry in the Encyclopædia Britannica
 American Ballet Theatre entry in the Columbia Encyclopedia
 Archive footage of ABT (then Ballet Theatre) performing Interplay in 1949 at Jacob's Pillow
 Archive footage of ABT (then Ballet Theatre) performing Fancy Free in 1949 at Jacob's Pillow
 American Ballet Theatre at Google Cultural Institute
Ballet Foundation collection of Ballet Russe de Monte Carlo and Ballet Theatre photographs, 1920s-1980s, held by the Dance Division, New York Public Library for the Performing Arts.

 
Ballet companies in the United States
History of ballet
Performing groups established in 1937
1939 establishments in New York City
Dance companies in New York City